Italy–Qatar relations are the bilateral relations between Italy and Qatar. Italy has an embassy in Doha and Qatar has an embassy in Rome.

Diplomatic visits
Then Qatari Emir Hamad bin Khalifa Al-Thani visited Italy on an official capacity in July 2005 and April 2012.

Italian President Giorgio Napolitano became Italy's first-ever leader to visit Qatar in November 2007. He held discussions with Qatar's emir over Iran's nuclear program and ways in which to boost bilateral relations.

A meeting was held between Qatari Emir Tamim bin Hamad Al Thani and Italian Prime Minister Paolo Gentiloni in November 2017 to discuss diplomatic relations and the recent Qatar diplomatic crisis.

Political cooperation
Both countries opened embassies in each other's capitals in 1992. 
They signed a technology and economy agreement in 1996.

COVID-19 pandemic 
During the COVID-19 pandemic, Qatar provided urgent medical assistance to Italy in April 2020. The Qatari Emiri Air Force delivered two field hospitals with a capacity of 1,000 beds equipped for treatment of people with COVID-19.

Economic relations
Trade turnover between Qatar and Italy have dropped in recent years. It was at its highest in 2012 when it reached €3.4 billion. By 2016, this figure decreased to €1.75 billion. This is attributed to less imports of Italian goods into Qatar and a lower demand of Qatari hydrocarbons by Italy, which constitute most of Qatar's exports to the country. Nonetheless, bilateral trade volume is still relatively high, with Italy being Qatar's 7th largest supplier.

Historically, Qatari investment in Italy has been insignificant due to perceived corruption in Italy by Qatari officials. In April 2013, the Qatari government purchased Palazzo della Gherardesca in Florence for €150 million. Investment relations started to improve in 2015 with the assistance of Prime Minister Matteo Renzi, who discussed possible investment opportunities with Emir Tamim bin Hamad at the November 2015 U.N. Climate Conference in Paris. Negotiations over-investment in the Banca Monte dei Paschi di Siena between Renzi and Tamim bin Hamad began two months later, but were halted after Renzi resigned as Prime Minister. In 2017, the value of Qatari investments in Italy was at roughly €2 billion and was mostly centered in Italy's tourism industry.

Military relations
Qatar is an important customer for Italy's defense industry. Italian shipbuilding company Fincantieri reached a €4 billion agreement with Qatar's government in June 2016 to construct vessels for its navy. Also included in the deal were support services and construction of a dock. In August 2017, Qatar purchased seven navy ships from Italy at a cost of €5 billion. A massive deal was concluded between Qatar and defense company Leonardo S.p.A. in March 2018 in which Qatar would buy 28 NH90 helicopters along with flight simulators for these helicopters. Shortly after the deal, Qatar and Italy carried out joint naval exercises in the Persian Gulf.

Cultural relations
Cultural collaboration agreements have been signed between the two countries first in January 2007, effective starting October 2011, and in January 2016, effective from 2016 to 2018.

The Italian Embassy in Doha is active in organizing cultural events in Qatar, mostly at the Katara Cultural Village. There was an Italian presence at both the 1st Katara European Jazz Festival and 2nd Katara European Jazz Festival in 2014 and 2015, respectively. In January 2016, as part of the cultural collaboration agreement signed that month, the Italian Embassy hosted the "Pesci fuor d’acqua" (Fish Out of Water) photo gallery in Katara.

Italian Embassy
The Italian embassy is located in Doha.

 Ambassador Alessandro Prunas

Qatari Embassy 
The Qatari embassy is located in Rome.

 Ambassador Abdul Aziz Ahmad Al-Maliki Juhani

Migration
There are approximately 1,500 Italian citizens living in Qatar as of 2015.

See also 
 Foreign relations of Italy 
 Foreign relations of Qatar

References

External links 
 Embassy of Italy in Doha
 Embassy of the State of Qatar in Rome

 
Qatar
Italy